South Kanara District Chess Association, also known as SKDCA is an association for the game of Chess, headquartered in Mangalore city of Karnataka in India. SKDCA has organized national level and FIDE rated chess tournaments, and international masters and grand masters have participated in these tournaments.

References

Chess organizations
Chess in India
Sport in Mangalore